The V.I.P. Cup is a retired trophy that was awarded to the minor premiers of each season in the Australian Ice Hockey League from 2004 to 2009; that is, the team that finishes first overall in the standings at the end of the regular season. The trophy is named for its sponsor, V.I.P. Home Services.

The last winners of the trophy are the Newcastle North Stars, who finished at the top of the standings in the 2009 AIHL season, but lost the grand final against the Adelaide Adrenaline. Since its inception in 2004, the V.I.P. Cup winner has never managed to claim the Goodall Cup in the corresponding playoff series.

The V.I.P. Cup was replaced for the 2010 season with the H Newman Reid Trophy, which was awarded to the Newcastle North Stars. The H Newman Reid Trophy ended up being backdated to 2008.

Winners

See also

Presidents' Trophy, the National Hockey League equivalent
H Newman Reid Trophy, the current AIHL equivalent

References

Australian Ice Hockey League
Ice hockey trophies and awards
Australian sports trophies and awards
2004 establishments in Australia
Awards established in 2004